Matthew Harrison O'Connor (born February 14, 1992) is a Canadian professional ice hockey goaltender currently playing with the HK Nitra of the Slovak Extraliga. O'Connor played a single game in the National Hockey League (NHL) with the Ottawa Senators during the 2015–16 season.

Playing career

Amateur
O'Connor went undrafted in both OHL and NHL drafts and, after spending two seasons in the OJHL, decided to play in the United States Hockey League. After spending two seasons with the Youngstown Phantoms O'Connor was offered a full scholarship to Boston University.  The Terriers won the Hockey East championship in 2014–15 and O'Connor was named to the Hockey East Second All-Star Team.

Professional
Over the course of three years with the Terriers O'Connor had garnered the attention of multiple NHL teams. O'Connor chose to forego his senior year at Boston University and signed a two-year contract with the Ottawa Senators in May 2015. He was expected to start the season with the Binghamton Senators minor league team but after an injury to Ottawa goalie Andrew Hammond, O'Connor stayed with the team and made his NHL debut on October 11, 2015 in a 3-1 defeat to the Montreal Canadiens.

It was announced by the Senators that O'Connor would not receive a qualifying offer as a restricted free agent, thus making him a free agent on June 26, 2017. On July 1, 2017, O'Connor agreed to a one-year, two-way $650, 000 contract with the Nashville Predators.

After spending his first four professional seasons in North America, playing extensively in the minor leagues, O'Connor embarked on a European career as a free agent, agreeing to a one-year contract with Danish club, Rødovre Mighty Bulls of the Metal Ligaen, on July 17, 2019.

Career statistics

Regular season and playoffs

References

External links
 

1992 births
Living people
Atlanta Gladiators players
Binghamton Senators players
Boston University Terriers men's ice hockey players
Canadian ice hockey goaltenders
Manchester Monarchs (ECHL) players
Milwaukee Admirals players
Ottawa Senators players
Quad City Mallards (ECHL) players
Ice hockey people from Toronto
Undrafted National Hockey League players
Youngstown Phantoms players
Wheeling Nailers players
Wichita Thunder players
Wilkes-Barre/Scranton Penguins players
HK Nitra players
Canadian expatriate ice hockey players in the United States
Canadian expatriate ice hockey players in Denmark
Canadian expatriate ice hockey players in Slovakia